Agaricus silvicola, also known as the wood mushroom, is a species of Agaricus mushroom related to the button mushroom.

Taxonomy
Originally described as the variety Agaricus campestris var. silvicola by Carlo Vittadini in 1832, it was promoted to distinct species status by Charles Horton Peck in 1873.

Varieties with larger bases have been described as A. abruptibulbus.

Description
The cap is light cream, and bruises yellow ochre when damaged. It is much the same colour as the cap, and has a fragile drooping ring. The flesh is thin and white, and smells of aniseed. It looks fairly similar to a young death cap.

The spores are brown, elliptical, and smooth.

Distribution and habitat
Agaricus silvicola grows in both deciduous and coniferous woodland in Britain, Europe, and North America. Appearing in the autumn, it is rarely seen in huge numbers, usually just a few, or solitary.

Edibility
It is edible and popular in Europe. It is suspected to have caused an allergic reaction in a few people in North America. (This reference is not supported by clinical cases).

Similar species
Agaricus abruptibulbus
Agaricus albolutescens
Agaricus arvensis – the horse mushroom
Agaricus campestris – the field mushroom
Agaricus hondensis
Agaricus osecanus
Agaricus semotus
Agaricus subrutilescens
Agaricus xanthodermus – the yellow stainer

See also
List of Agaricus species

References

silvicola
Edible fungi
Fungi described in 1832
Fungi of Europe
Fungi of North America